Fanfare is a 1958 Dutch comedy film directed by Bert Haanstra. The film was entered into the 1959 Cannes Film Festival and the 1st Moscow International Film Festival. It was the most successful Dutch film at the time with over 2.6 million admission until surpassed by the 1973 film Turkish Delight.

Cast
 Hans Kaart as Geursen
 Bernhard Droog as Krijns
 Ineke Brinkman as Marije
 Wim van den Heuvel as Douwe
 Andrea Domburg as Lies
 Albert Mol as Schalm
 Henk van Buuren as Valentijn
 Herbert Joeks as Koendering
 Johan Valk as Van Ogten
 Ton Lutz as Altena
 Riek Schagen as Aaltje
 Sara Heyblom as Leidster van vereniging
 Dio Huysmans as Zwaansdijk

References

External links

1958 films
1958 comedy films
1950s Dutch-language films
Dutch black-and-white films
Films directed by Bert Haanstra